When Worlds Collide is a Multi-Versal role-playing game that uses Rifts to transfer players to parallel and new worlds.

Game system 
The role playing game works on a basic dice system called T.H.E. System or Tri Hexahedral Engine System, using three 6 sided dice for most decision rolls.

Modules for WWC 
The following modules have been created for the When Worlds Collide RPG
 You Ain't From Around Here, Are You?
 Hell Freezes Over
 Vampire Holocaust
 Born From Disaster
 The Next Stop on the Curve
 The Colour of Light
 The Weight of Light
 The Warmth of Light

Time travel and multiple reality role-playing games
Parallel universes in fiction